Captain America is the name of several comic book titles featuring the character Captain America and published by Marvel Comics, beginning with the original Captain America comic book series which debuted in 1968.

Publication history

Captain America was starring in the title Tales of Suspense, which was retitled Captain America with issue #100 (April 1968). The new title Captain America continued to feature artwork by Jack Kirby, as well as a short run by Jim Steranko, and work by many of the industry's top artists and writers. It was called Captain America and the Falcon from #134 (Feb. 1971) to #222 (June 1978), although the Falcon's name was not on the cover for issues #193, 200, and 216. The 1972–1975 run on the title by writer Steve Englehart and artist Sal Buscema saw the series become one of Marvel's top-sellers. In 2010, Comics Bulletin ranked Englehart and Buscema's run on Captain America fourth on its list of the "Top 10 1970s Marvels". Kirby returned to the series as writer and penciler with issue #193 (Jan. 1975) and remained through #214 (Oct. 1977).

This series – considered Captain America volume one by comics researchers and historians – ended with #454 (Aug. 1996). Captain America Vol. 1 should not be confused with the 1940s series Captain America Comics (1941–1949, 1954) and Captain America's Weird Tales (1949–1950).

This series was almost immediately followed by the 13-issue Captain America vol. 2 (Nov. 1996 – Nov. 1997, part of the "Heroes Reborn" crossover), the 50-issue Captain America vol. 3 (Jan. 1998 – Feb. 2002), the 32-issue Captain America vol. 4 (June 2002 – Dec. 2004), and Captain America vol. 5 (Jan. 2005 – Aug. 2011). Beginning with the 600th overall issue (Aug. 2009), Captain America resumed its original numbering, as if the series numbering had continued uninterrupted after #454.

As part of the aftermath of Marvel Comics' company-crossover storyline "Civil War", Steve Rogers was ostensibly killed in Captain America vol. 5, #25 (March 2007). Series writer Ed Brubaker remarked, "What I found is that all the really hard-core left-wing fans want Cap to be standing out on and giving speeches on the street corner against the George W. Bush administration, and all the really right-wing fans all want him to be over in the streets of Baghdad, punching out Saddam Hussein." The character's co-creator, Joe Simon, said, "It's a hell of a time for him to go. We really need him now." Artist Alex Ross designed a slightly revised Captain America costume that former sidekick Bucky Barnes began to wear as the new Captain America in vol. 5, #34 (March 2008). As of 2007, an estimated 210 million copies of "Captain America" comic books had been sold in 75 countries.

The storyline of Rogers' return began in issue #600.

Marvel stated in May 2011 that Rogers, following the public death of Bucky Barnes in the "Fear Itself" crossover, would resume his Captain America identity in a sixth volume of Captain America, by writer Ed Brubaker and artist Steve McNiven. The Captain America title continued from issue #620 featuring team up stories with Bucky (#620-#628), Hawkeye (#629-#632), Iron Man (#633–635), Namor (#635.1), and Black Widow (#636-#640), and the title ended its print run with issue #640.

See also
 1968 in comics
 Silver Age of Comic Books
 American comic book tropes

References

External links
 Captain America at the Comic Book DB

 
1968 comics debuts
1996 comics debuts
1998 comics debuts
2002 comics debuts
2005 comics debuts
Captain America titles
Comics by Dan Jurgens
Comics by Dave Gibbons
Comics by David Michelinie
Comics by Gerry Conway
Comics by J. M. DeMatteis
Comics by Jack Kirby
Comics by Jeph Loeb
Comics by John Byrne (comics)
Comics by Mark Waid
Comics by Roger Stern
Comics by Roy Thomas
Comics by Stan Lee
Comics by Steve Englehart
Comics by Steve Gerber
Marvel Comics adapted into films